NASA reentry prototypes were a series of atmospheric reentry prototypes built by NASA and experimented in a series of top secret projects between the 1940s and 1960s. These prototypes were capable of self propulsion and guided landings.

Unmanned aerial vehicles of the United States
NASA spacecraft